Kieran Joseph Crowley (June 7, 1916 – January 5, 1975), frequently mis-spelled as Kiernan Crowley, was an American professional basketball player. He played for the Sheboygan Red Skins in the National Basketball League in five games during the 1938–39 season and averaged 2.0 points per game.

References

1916 births
1975 deaths
American men's basketball players
Basketball players from Chicago
DePaul Blue Demons men's basketball players
Guards (basketball)
Sheboygan Red Skins players